Randall Lee "Randy" Beisler (born October 24, 1944) is a former professional American football offensive lineman in the National Football League (NFL) for the Philadelphia Eagles, the San Francisco 49ers, and the Kansas City Chiefs. He was drafted by the Eagles in the first round of the 1966 NFL Draft. He played college football at Indiana University.

On May 5, 2013, Beisler was inducted into the Indiana Football Hall of Fame.

His brother, Jerry Beisler is a writer and poet.

References

1944 births
Living people
Players of American football from Gary, Indiana
American football offensive guards
American football offensive tackles
American football defensive ends
American football defensive tackles
Indiana Hoosiers football players
Philadelphia Eagles players
San Francisco 49ers players
Kansas City Chiefs players